Ahmed Fareed is an American studio host and sports reporter for American television network NBC Sports.

Early life
Fareed is a native of Sparta, Michigan, where he played quarterback for the Spartans. After graduating from Sparta in 1998, Fareed spent one year at Michigan State University, before transferring to Syracuse University. He graduated from the S. I. Newhouse School of Public Communications in 2002 with a degree in Broadcast Journalism.

Career
Fareed started off his career for one year at WXMI-TV, and became a weekend sports anchor for WILX-TV and WSYM-TV in Lansing, Michigan. Fareed then moved to WAVY-TV in Portsmouth, VA, where he spent five years covering local sports. There, he covered the Washington Redskins, the Norfolk Tides, Virginia Tech Hokies, and the Virginia Cavaliers.

Prior to his work at NBC Sports Bay Area in San Francisco, he was employed with MLB Network from 2011-12, where he appeared regularly on studio programming including MLB Tonight and Quick Pitch. Fareed has also served as a studio host on USA Network and NBCSN for the 2016 Summer and 2018 Winter Olympic games.

In February 2019, NBC Sports Net announced that Fareed was leaving his position in the Bay Area to join their headquarters in Stamford, Connecticut, where he will be covering various sports including Premiership Rugby.

In July 2021, Fareed also served as a studio host on NBCSN and Olympic Channel for the 2020 Tokyo Olympics.

In 2022, Fareed started serving as the field reporter for MLB games on Peacock. In November, he hosted the 2022 Golden Goggle Awards at the Marriott Marquis in New York City.

Personal life
Fareed married Cathleen Fareed in November 2011.

References

Year of birth missing (living people)
Living people
American television sports announcers
Major League Baseball broadcasters
MLB Network personalities
Olympic Games broadcasters
People from Sparta, Michigan
S.I. Newhouse School of Public Communications alumni